The First Circle is a 1992 Canadian-French made-for-television drama film directed by Sheldon Larry, starring Victor Garber, Christopher Plummer, F. Murray Abraham and Robert Powell. It is an adaptation of the novel In the First Circle by Aleksandr Solzhenitsyn.

At the 1992 Gemini Awards, the film was awarded the prize for Best Photography in a Dramatic Program or Series. It was also nominated for Best Dramatic Mini-Series, and Best Writing, Best Performance by an Actor and Best Performance by an Actress in a Leading Role in a Dramatic Program or Mini-Series.

Cast
 Robert Powell as Gleb Nerzhin
 Victor Garber as Lev Rubin
 Christopher Plummer as Viktor Abakumov
 F. Murray Abraham as Joseph Stalin
 Corinne Touzet as Nadya Nerzhina
 Dominic Raacke as Nikolai Shagov
 Günther Maria Halmer as Vladimir Chelnov
David Hewlett as Rostislav
Raf Vallone as Pyotr Makarygin
Vernon Dobtcheff as Ryumin

References

External links

1992 television films
1992 films
1992 drama films
English-language Canadian films
English-language French films
Cultural depictions of Joseph Stalin
Films based on Russian novels
Films based on works by Aleksandr Solzhenitsyn
Canadian drama television films
Films scored by Gabriel Yared
French television films
Films directed by Sheldon Larry
1990s Canadian films